Peureulak River (Krueng Peurelak) is a river in the province of Aceh, northern Sumatra, Indonesia, about 1600 km northwest of the capital Jakarta.

Geography
The river flows in the northern area of Sumatra with predominantly tropical rainforest climate (designated as Af in the Köppen-Geiger climate classification). The annual average temperature in the area is 26 °C. The warmest month is February, when the average temperature is around 27 °C, and the coldest is March, at 24 °C. The average annual rainfall is 2996 mm. The wettest month is December, with an average of 526 mm rainfall, and the driest is March, with 156 mm rainfall.

See also
List of rivers of Indonesia
List of rivers of Sumatra

References

Rivers of Aceh
Rivers of Indonesia